The Serie B 1933–34 was the fifth tournament of this competition played in Italy since its creation. This championship was organized with two groups and a final round to determine the promoted team.

Teams
Viareggio, Perugia and Foggia had been promoted from Prima Divisione, while Bari and Pro Patria had been relegated from Serie A. Atalanta and Pistoiese had been re-elected by the Higher Directory to expand the league.

More, during the summer the FIGC decided to abolish with immediate effect the round robin as too expensive, and Catanzaro, Seregno, SPAL, Pavia, Vicenza and Derthona were invited to join.

As the fascist authorities forbade a natural North-South division, a strange West-East partition was established.

Qualification

Group A

Final classification

Results

Group B

Final classification

Results

Relegation tie-breaker
Classification

Results

Final round

Final classification

Results

Promotion tie-breaker
Played on June 13 in Bologna

S.G. Sampierdarenese were promoted to Serie A.

References and sources
Almanacco Illustrato del Calcio - La Storia 1898-2004, Panini Edizioni, Modena, September 2005

1933-1934
2
Italy